Valdiviomyia valdiviana is a species of hoverfly in the family Syrphidae.

Distribution
Chile.

References

Eristalinae
Insects described in 1865
Diptera of South America
Taxa named by Rodolfo Amando Philippi
Endemic fauna of Chile